The  (SDGQ) is the provincial graphic design association in the Canadian province of Quebec. Its stated aim is to advance the profession of graphic design in Quebec and to help its members develop both professionally and financially. Its activities include professional development, co-organizing the Grafika design awards competition, lobbying, and the DGA certification program.

The SDGQ has a reconciliatory role in the debate on graphic design certification in Canada.

History
However, SGQ was not officially founded until 1974 when the new association was incorporated.

On June 14, 2011, during its annual general meeting, the SDGQ officially launched its certification program for graphic designers in Quebec.

In 2013 the SDGQ adopted a new visual identity, replacing its existing “dg” wordmark with a new “SDGQ” wordmark.

Certification
SDGQ members working in the field of graphic design who have accumulated a minimum of 7 years of combined professional experience and education in graphic design can apply to be certified. Candidates are required to submit their portfolios to a panel of three DGA-certified judges for an anonymous review. During the review, the candidate’s work is evaluated according to three criteria, namely, pertinence, responsibility, and creativity.

DGAs are required to follow SDGQ’s code of ethics. There is a procedure in place to investigate DGAs who are accused of violating the code of ethics; violators can receive penalties up to and including having their DGA titles revoked.

A plan to align the DGA and RGD certifications was announced in 2012, and the written examination portion of the process was set to harmonize within 5 years. The DGA title is considered by the Association of Registered Graphic Designers to be the French equivalent of its RGD title.

Affiliations
It also has formal partnerships with the Society of Graphic Designers of Canada, the Association of Registered Graphic Designers of Ontario, and Infopress, a publishing company.

Publications

SDGQ also publishes a blog called , which has entered a period of hiatus since 2011.

See also
 Society of Graphic Designers of Canada
 Association of Registered Graphic Designers

Notes

References

Professional associations based in Quebec
Organizations based in Montreal
Graphic design
Design institutions
Communication design
Professional associations based in Canada
1974 establishments in Quebec
Arts organizations established in 1974